|}

This is a list of electoral district results for the 1917 Victorian state election.

While the Nationalist party was split into the Ministerialist Peacock and Economy Bowser factions, statistical records show the Nationalist vote combined. The affiliation of each Nationalist candidate is present on the Candidates page.

Election was conducted in 65 single-member districts using First past the post where only two candidates were in the running and instant-runoff voting where more than two candidates were in the running.

Results by electoral district

Abbotsford

Albert Park

Allandale

Ballarat East

Ballarat West

Barwon

Benalla 

 Two party preferred vote was estimated.

Benambra

Bendigo East 

 Two party preferred vote was estimated.

Bendigo West

Boroondara

Borung

Brighton 

 Two party preferred vote was estimated.

Brunswick 

 Two party preferred vote was estimated.

Bulla 

 Two candidate preferred vote was estimated.

Carlton

Castlemaine and Maldon

Collingwood

Dalhousie

Dandenong

Daylesford

Dundas

Eaglehawk

East Melbourne

Essendon

Evelyn

Fitzroy

Flemington

Geelong

Gippsland East 

 Two party preferred vote was estimated.

Gippsland North

Gippsland South 

 Preferences were not distributed.

Gippsland West

Glenelg

Goulburn Valley

Grenville

Gunbower

Hampden

Hawthorn

Jika Jika

Kara Kara

Korong

Lowan

Maryborough

Melbourne

Mornington

North Melbourne

Ovens

Polwarth

Port Fairy

Port Melbourne 

 Two party preferred vote was estimated.

Prahran

Richmond

Rodney

St Kilda

Stawell and Ararat

Swan Hill 

 Two candidate preferred vote was not counted.

Toorak

Upper Goulburn

Walhalla

Wangaratta

Waranga

Warrenheip

Warrnambool

Williamstown

See also 

 1917 Victorian state election
 Candidates of the 1917 Victorian state election
 Members of the Victorian Legislative Assembly, 1917–1920

References 

Results of Victorian state elections
1910s in Victoria (Australia)